Indus Vallis is a vallis (valley) in the Arabia quadrangle of Mars, located at 19.3° North and 321.3° West.  It is 307 km long and was named for the Indus River in Pakistan. The westernmost part of the valley is in the vicinity of Cassini Crater.

References

Valleys and canyons on Mars
Arabia quadrangle